Thomas Estcourt (27 September 1748 – 2 December 1818) of Estcourt House, near Tetbury, Gloucestershire was an English member of Parliament

He was born in 1748, the eldest surviving son of Matthew Estcourt of Cam, Gloucestershire, and his wife, Lydiah. He was educated at St John's College, Oxford, from 1766.

He succeeded to the Estcourt estate of a distant kinsman in 1750 and then his father before 1782. He was High Sheriff of Gloucestershire for 1774–75.

He was returned unopposed as MP for Cricklade from 20 March 1790 to 1806, promising to serve "founded on independence and guided by integrity".

He married in 1774, the Hon. Jane Grimston, daughter of James Grimston, 2nd Viscount Grimston and had 2 sons and 2 daughters. His eldest son Thomas Grimston Estcourt also became an MP.

References 

1748 births
1818 deaths
British MPs 1790–1796
British MPs 1796–1800
UK MPs 1801–1802
UK MPs 1802–1806
Alumni of St John's College, Oxford
Members of the Parliament of Great Britain for Cricklade
Members of the Parliament of the United Kingdom for Cricklade
People from Gloucestershire
High Sheriffs of Gloucestershire